Ronda Curtin Engelhardt  (born November 2, 1980, in Roseville, Minnesota) is an American ice hockey player and coach. She currently serves as head coach of the Minnesota Whitecaps, leading the team to an Isobel Cup victory in 2019. During her playing career with the University of Minnesota Golden Gophers ice hockey team, she was a finalist for the Patty Kazmaier Award, and was selected to the Western Collegiate Hockey Association women's team of the decade in the 2000s.

Career
Prior to playing for Minnesota, Curtin was a member of the United States Select Team roster that competed at the 1999 Christmas Cup tournament in Fussen, Germany, on December 27–30, 1999. Some of her teammates included future Olympians Julie Chu, Natalie Darwitz, Jenny Schmidgall and Krissy Wendell.

Curtin played both defense and forward as the University of Minnesota Golden Gophers won the 2001–02 Western Collegiate Hockey Association regular-season title for the second consecutive season.  Curtin's season included 45 points (11 goals, 34 assists) in 34 games, making her the first defender in WCHA history to lead the conference in regular-season scoring. She led the WCHA in assists (34) and power-play points (21). During the season, Curtin garnered WCHA Player of the Week honors three times and became the first women's ice hockey player in Minnesota to win the award three times in a single season. For her efforts, she was named the 2002 WCHA Player of the Year, the WCHA Defensive Player of the year, a WCHA First Team selection and the WCHA Tournament Most Valuable Player. For the 2002–03 season, she was named team captain.

After finishing her college playing career, she joined the University of St. Thomas hockey staff as an assistant coach for four seasons and earned her Master's degree. She later coached the girls' team at Breck School.

In 2018, she was hired as a co-coach of the professional Minnesota Whitecaps in the National Women's Hockey League for their inaugural 2018–19 season in the league.

Personal
In addition to her athletic achievements, she also participates in various community service projects. Her younger sister, Renee, was a forward at Minnesota. She married professional hockey player Brett Engelhardt and had three children.

Career stats

Awards and honors

High school
  1995–96  First Team All-State.
  1996–97  First Team All-State.
  1997–98  First Team All-State.
  1998–99  First Team All-State.
   2 on the Top Career Scorers listing with 470 pts (behind her younger sister Renee's 544 points)
  All State-Tournament pick four times.
  1997 Player of the Year
  1999 Ms. Hockey Award

Golden Gopher awards
2002 GWH Award
2002 Most Valuable Player Award
 2002, 2003 Highest GPA Award
2003 Team Captain
2002 Kathleen C. and Robert B. Ridder Scholarship
2002, 2003 First Team All-Americans
2002 Patty Kazmaier Finalists
2002, 2003 First-Team All-WCHA
2002, 2003 WCHA Defensive Player of the Year
2002 WCHA Player of the Year
 2002 WCHA All-Tournament Team
2001, 2002, 2003 WCHA All-Academic Team & Academic All-Big Ten
WCHA Player of the Week: 2001–02 season, (Dec. 17, Feb. 11, March 4)
WCHA Rookie of the Week: 1999–2000 season (Oct. 18, Nov. 15, Feb. 15)
WCHA Team of the Decade (2000s)

References

External links
 

1980 births
American women's ice hockey forwards
Ice hockey coaches from Minnesota
Living people
Minnesota Golden Gophers women's ice hockey players
Minnesota Ms. Hockey Award winners
People from Roseville, Minnesota
Premier Hockey Federation coaches
Ice hockey players from Minnesota
Minnesota Whitecaps